The latissimus dorsi is a large, flat muscle on the back that stretches to the sides, behind the arm, and is partly covered by the trapezius on the back near the midline. The word latissimus dorsi (plural: latissimi dorsi) comes from Latin and means "broadest [muscle] of the back", from "latissimus"' and "dorsum". The pair of muscles are commonly known as "lats", especially among bodybuilders. The latissimus dorsi is the largest muscle in the upper body.

The latissimus dorsi is responsible for extension, adduction, transverse extension also known as horizontal abduction (or horizontal extension), flexion from an extended position, and (medial) internal rotation of the shoulder joint. It also has a synergistic role in extension and lateral flexion of the lumbar spine.

Due to bypassing the scapulothoracic joints and attaching directly to the spine, the actions the latissimi dorsi have on moving the arms can also influence the movement of the scapulae, such as their downward rotation during a pull up.

Structure

Variations

The number of dorsal vertebrae to which it is attached varies from four to eight; the number of costal attachments varies; muscle fibers may or may not reach the crest of the ilium.

A muscle slip, the axillary arch, varying from 7 to 10 cm in length, and from 5 to 15 mm in breadth, occasionally springs from the upper edge of the latissimus dorsi about the middle of the posterior fold of the axilla, and crosses the axilla in front of the axillary vessels and nerves, to join the under surface of the tendon of the pectoralis major, the coracobrachialis, or the fascia over the biceps brachii. This axillary arch crosses the axillary artery, just above the spot usually selected for the application of a ligature, and may mislead a surgeon. It is present in about 7% of the population and may be easily recognized by the transverse direction of its fibers.  Guy et al. extensively described this muscular variant using MRI data and positively correlated its presence with symptoms of neurological impingement.

A fibrous slip usually passes from the upper border of the tendon of the Latissimus dorsi, near its insertion, to the long head of the triceps brachii. This is occasionally muscular, and is the representative of the dorsoepitrochlearis brachii of apes. This muscular form is found in ~5% of humans and is sometimes termed the latissimocondyloideus.

The latissimus dorsi crosses the inferior angle of the scapula.  A study found that, of 100 cadavers dissected:
 43% had "a substantial amount" of muscular fibers in the latissimus dorsi originating from the scapula.
 36% had few or no muscular fibers, but a "soft fibrous link" between the scapula and the latissimus dorsi
 21% had little or no connecting tissue between the two structures.

Triangles
 The lateral margin of the latissimus dorsi is separated below from the obliquus externus abdominis by a small triangular interval, the lumbar triangle of Petit, the base of which is formed by the iliac crest, and its floor by the obliquus internus abdominis.
 Another triangle is situated behind the scapula. It is bounded above by the trapezius, below by the latissimus dorsi, and laterally by the vertebral border of the scapula; the floor is partly formed by the rhomboideus major. If the scapula is drawn forward by folding the arms across the chest, and the trunk bent forward, parts of the sixth and seventh ribs and the interspace between them become subcutaneous and available for auscultation. The space is therefore known as the triangle of auscultation.
The latissimus dorsi can be remembered best for insertion as "A Miss Between Two Majors". As the latissimus dorsi inserts into the floor of the intertubercular groove of the humerus it is surrounded by two major muscles. The teres major inserts medially on the medial lip of the intertubercular groove and the pectoralis major inserts laterally onto the lateral lip.

Nerve supply
The latissimus dorsi is innervated by the sixth, seventh, and eighth cervical nerves through the thoracodorsal (long subscapular) nerve. Electromyography suggests that it consists of  six groups of muscle fibres that can be independently coordinated by the central nervous system.

Function
The latissimus dorsi assists in depression of the arm with the teres major and pectoralis major. It adducts, extends, and internally rotates the shoulder. When the arms are in a fixed overhead position, the latissimus dorsi pulls the trunk upward and forward.

It has a synergistic role in extension (posterior fibers) and lateral flexion (anterior fibers) of the lumbar spine, and assists as a muscle of both forced expiration (anterior fibers) and an accessory muscle of inspiration (posterior fibers).

Most latissimus dorsi exercises concurrently recruit the teres major, posterior fibres of the deltoid, long head of the triceps brachii, among numerous other stabilizing muscles. Compound exercises for the 'lats' typically involve elbow flexion and tend to recruit the biceps brachii, brachialis, and brachioradialis for this function. Depending on the line of pull, the trapezius muscles can be recruited as well; horizontal pulling motions such as rows recruit both latissimus dorsi and trapezius heavily.

Training
The power/size/strength of this muscle can be trained with a variety of different exercises. Some of these include:
 Vertical pulling movements such as pull-downs and pull-ups (including chin-ups)
 Horizontal pulling movements such as bent-over row, T-bar row and other rowing exercises
 Shoulder extension movements with straight arms such as straight-arm lat pulldowns and Pull-overs
 Deadlift

Clinical significance
Tight latissimus dorsi has been shown to be a contributor to chronic shoulder pain and chronic back pain.  Because the latissimus dorsi connects the spine to the humerus, tightness in this muscle can manifest as either sub-optimal glenohumeral joint (shoulder) function which leads to chronic pain or tendinitis in the tendinous fasciae connecting the latissimus dorsi to the thoracic and lumbar spine.

The latissimus dorsi is a potential source of muscle for breast reconstruction surgery after mastectomy (e.g. Mannu flap)  or to correct pectoral hypoplastic defects such as Poland's syndrome.  An absent or hypoplastic latissimus dorsi can be one of the associated symptoms of Poland's syndrome.

Cardiac support
For heart patients with low cardiac output and who are not candidates for cardiac transplantation, a procedure called cardiomyoplasty may support the failing heart. This procedure involves wrapping the latissimus dorsi muscles around the heart and electrostimulating them in synchrony with ventricular systole.

Injury
Injuries to the latissimus dorsi are rare. They occur disproportionately in baseball pitchers. Diagnosis can be achieved by visualization of the muscle and movement testing. MRI of the shoulder girdle will confirm the diagnosis. Muscle belly injuries are treated with rehabilitation while tendon avulsion injuries can be treated surgically, or with rehab. Regardless of treatment, patients tend to return to play without any functional losses.

Additional images

See also

Muscle energy techniques

References

External links
  - "Superficial layer of the extrinsic muscles of the back."
 

Muscles of the upper limb
Shoulder adductors
Shoulder extensors
Shoulder medial rotators
Shoulder flexors
Spine lateral flexors